The Franz Kafka Museum is a museum located in Prague dedicated to the author Franz Kafka. The museum hosts a number of first edition Kafka books. All other exhibits like letters, diaries and drawings created by Kafka are facsimiles, i.e. copies from archives and other collections. The museum is characterized as both literary and biographical.

History 
The exhibit was first displayed in Barcelona in 1999 in a three-part exhibition exploring famous authors' relationships to their cities. The Kafka exhibit was called "The City of K.: Franz Kafka in Prague" and the two other exhibits explored James Joyce and Dublin and Fernando Pessoa and Lisbon. The Franz Kafka exhibition moved to New York City's Jewish Museum in 2002 before its permanent installment, which opened in the summer of 2005 in the Herget Brickworks building in the Malá Strana district of Prague.

Exhibition 
The exhibition features copies of manuscripts as well as photographs and personal documents, but no originals. It includes correspondence between Kafka and writer Milena Jesenská. Some of the explanatory texts are hardly readable, because they are located on transparent surfaces with exhibits in the same color as the letters. All texts are in English, some - mainly quotations - also in Czech and German. The impression therefore is that the museum is made mainly for foreign tourists rather than people from the Czech Republic. There are two permanent exhibitions: one explores Prague's influence on Kafka's work, and the other focuses on how Kafka describes Prague in his writing.

The museum features strange and absurd design elements that are inspired by Franz Kafka's unusual ideas. The space is dark and has special elements such as a long, red-lit staircase and mysterious sound effects. Outside the museum is an exhibit called Piss, a bronze fountain of two men urinating into a lake shaped like the Czech Republic. It was created by Czech sculptor David Černý in 2004.

References

External links 
 Official website (available in Czech, English and German)
 Kafka Museum – Lonely Planet
 Kafka Museum – Official Prague tourist website

Franz Kafka
Museums in Prague